The 2019 Skate America presented by American Cruise Lines was the first event in the 2019–20 ISU Grand Prix of Figure Skating, a senior-level international invitational competition series. It was held at Orleans Arena in Las Vegas, Nevada on October 18–20. Medals were awarded in the disciplines of men's singles, ladies' singles, pair skating, and ice dance. Skaters earned points toward qualifying for the 2019–20 Grand Prix Final.

Skate America was the first senior international event in International Skating Union history to be streamed live by the ISU on YouTube with geographical restrictions, as part of the federation's new deal for the 2019–20 Grand Prix series to reach countries that do not have broadcasting rights for any skating events.

Entries
The ISU announced the preliminary assignments on June 20, 2019.

Changes to preliminary assignments

Results

Men

Ladies
Russia's Anna Shcherbakova became the first woman to land two quad lutzes in the free skate.

Pairs

Ice dance
The scores for the rhythm dance were initially calculated erroneously, omitting the Grade of Execution points for the man's half of the pattern step. Hours later, the scores were revised to reflect the proper point totals.

References

Skate America
2019 in figure skating
Skate America